Caiapó River may refer to:

Brazil
 Caiapó River (Goiás)
 Caiapó River (Tocantins)

See also
 Carapo River, Venezuela